Penpals, people who regularly write to each other.

Pen Pals or penpals may also refer to:

Music
 Pen Pals (band), a indie folk band from the United States
"Penpals", by Sloan from Twice Removed
"Penpals", a track from Jazz Suite Inspired by Dylan Thomas's "Under Milk Wood"

Other uses
 "Pen Pals" (Star Trek: The Next Generation), a second season episode of Star Trek: The Next Generation first broadcast on May 1, 1989
 Pen Pals, a 1992 film starring Bai Ling
 Penpal (novel), a 2012 self-published horror/thriller novel by Dathan Auerbach
 "Pen Pals" (Foster's Home for Imaginary Friends), a 2007 cartoon short from Foster's Home for Imaginary Friends